Ernst Morgenthaler (1887–1962) was a Swiss painter. His wife, Sasha Morgenthaler, was a well-known doll manufacturer in Zurich. Their one of their sons, Fritz Morgenthaler, was a psychoanalyst and painter.

Reference

20th-century Swiss painters
Swiss male painters
1887 births
1962 deaths
20th-century Swiss male artists